Evil was a garage rock band from Miami, Florida, active between late 1965 and early 1967.   They were known for a hard–driving, sometimes, thrashing 60s punk sound that combined elements of blues, rockabilly, and British invasion influences (particularly the tougher sounding London-based outfits of the time, such as The Yardbirds, The Who, The Pretty Things, and The Small Faces).  They recorded several songs, amongst which “Always Runnin' Around” and “Whatcha Gonna Do” were released as a single on Living Legend Records in 1966.  The band would eventually be signed to Capitol Records, but broke up shortly thereafter.  In more recent years they have become particularly noted for several previously unreleased songs recorded in 1966, which have been released in recent years on various independent labels from acetates, such as "From a Curbstone," "Short Life," and especially "I'm Movin' On," which is now regarded as a garage classic.

The band was formed in 1965 by Stan Kinchen, who would play lead guitar on most of their recordings. one night that year, after dance, Al Banyai, the band's rhythm guitarist asked John Doyle to join as lead singer.   Doyle would come up with the name of the band:  "We were looking for something dark and scary. We were all into Edgar Allan Poe, almost named the band that, then Raven, then just EVIL! The story is that we named it after the blues tune..."  Later in 1965, Larry O' Connell, on bass, and Doug Romanella, on drums, would be added to the lineup.  In March 1966, after winning WFUN's annual Dade County Youth Fair Battle Of The Bands, the band were awarded a chance to make several recordings in a one-day marathon session at the Dukoff recording studio in Miami, where they cut several demos and acetates.  Amongst the self-penned songs recorded, there were "I'm Movin' On," "From a Curbstone," "Short Life," and Always Runnin' Around.

Later that year Al Banyai, Larry O'Connell, and Doug Romanella departed and were replaced by John Dalton (rhythm guitar), Mike Hughes (bass), and Jeff Allen (drums).  Their new drummer, Jeff Allen, joined after the breakup of his former group, another Miami band, The Montells. He would occasionally travel to England, where he was able to go to clubs and witness, firsthand, many of the latest British bands playing live and would then bring his observations back home to share with fellow band members.  Near the end of 1966, they would record again in Miami, this time at Criteria Studios, with their version of the Small Faces' "Whacha Gonna Do."  “Always Runnin' Around” and “Whatcha Gonna Do” were released as a single on Living Legend Records in late 1966.  By the end of the year they signed to Capitol Records, who re-released the same single on their own label, with the band's name mistakenly printed as "The Evil."  However, shortly afterward, in 1967, the band broke up.

In 2010, Jeff Allen, second drummer for Evil (and earlier with the Montells) died. On February 14, 2014, former lead singer, John Doyle, passed.

Personnel

First Lineup (1965-1966)
 John Doyle - Lead Singer
 Stan Kinchen - Lead Guitar 
 Al Banyai - Rhythm Guitar
 Larry O'Connell - Bass 
 Doug Romanella - Drums

Second Lineup (1966-1967)
 John Doyle - vocals
 Stan Kinchen - lead guitar
 John Dalton - rhythm guitar
 Mike Hughes - bass
 Jeff Allen - drums

Discography

Singles
 "Always Runnin' Around"/ "Whatcha Gonna Do" (Living Legend LL-108, rel. 1967; Capitol 2038, rel. 1967)
 "I’m Movin' On" (Evil)/"You Can’t Make Me" (The Montells) (Norton 826–8, rec. 1966, rel. 1997)
 "From a Curbstone"/"Short Life" (Florida Archive Recordings F.A.R. 6601, rec. 1966, rel. 2012)

Albums
 The Montells/Evil (Corduroy, Cord 027, rel. 1997 on LP) (includes songs: "Don't Put Me Down" and "I Know I'll Die")

References

External links
 The Limestone Lounge: Jeff Allen of the Montells & Evil

Musical groups from Miami
Garage rock groups from Florida
Protopunk groups
Norton Records artists
Capitol Records artists
Musical groups established in 1965
Musical groups disestablished in 1967